Giovan Luigi "Chiappino" Vitelli (1519 – July 1575) was an Italian marquis and military leader, son of Niccolò Vitelli.  

Vitelli served as captain under Cosimo I de' Medici in his wars to gain Florence, Siena and Montalcino, and was appointed  governor of Piombino (1543).  

He was also a general in the Spanish Army of Flanders, as well as Tuscan ambassador in the England of Elizabeth I.  He was marquis of Cetona, that he acquired from Cosimo I de' Medici (1556).  

Here,  he restored the fortress and built the Piazza Vitelli town square (1559), today the Piazza Garibaldi, as well as the Palazzo Vitelli which can be seen  today, holding a significant art collection.  He used acquisitions from other places, such as a belltower from Montepescali, a town he had surrounded near Grosseto (1555).  His military inventions include a siege technique, first tried at the town of Mons in, for  the Spanish Duke of Alba (1572).

He died in the Netherlands in 1575.

References

1519 births
1575 deaths
16th-century condottieri
Generals of former Italian states
Chiappino